Daniela Montoya Quiroz (born 22 August 1990) is a Colombian footballer who plays as a midfielder for Junior and the Colombia women's national team. She represented her country at the 2011 and 2015 editions of the FIFA Women's World Cup, and the 2012 Summer Olympics.

Montoya competed at the 2019 WAFF Women's Clubs Championship for Bahraini club Riffa SC, scoring once in four matches.

International career
At the 2015 World Cup in Canada, Montoya's goal in a 1–1 draw with Mexico was described as one of the best goals of the tournament. She was not included in the selection for the 2016 Summer Olympics in Brazil, after criticizing the Colombian Football Federation for its failure to pay the team's contractual bonuses at the previous year's World Cup.

Football Career and Transfer Statistics 
We are going to show you the list of football clubs and seasons in which Daniela Montoya Quiróz has played. It includes the total number of appearance (caps), substitution details, goals, yellow and red cards stats.

References

External links

 
 Profile at La Liga 

1990 births
Living people
Footballers from Medellín
Colombian women's footballers
Women's association football midfielders
Primera División (women) players
Levante UD Femenino players
Riffa SC players
Colombia women's international footballers
2011 FIFA Women's World Cup players
2015 FIFA Women's World Cup players
Olympic footballers of Colombia
Footballers at the 2012 Summer Olympics
Footballers at the 2015 Pan American Games
Medalists at the 2015 Pan American Games
Pan American Games medalists in football
Footballers at the 2019 Pan American Games
Medalists at the 2019 Pan American Games
Pan American Games gold medalists for Colombia
Colombian expatriate women's footballers
Colombian expatriate sportspeople in Spain
Expatriate women's footballers in Spain
Colombian expatriates in Bahrain
Expatriate footballers in Bahrain
Colombian women's futsal players